Senator Caldwell may refer to:

Alexander Caldwell (1830–1917), U.S. Senator from Kansas from 1871 to 1873
Alfred Caldwell (politician) (1817–1868), Virginia State Senate
Alfred Caldwell Jr. (1847–1925), West Virginia State Senate
Ben F. Caldwell (1848–1924), Illinois State Senate
Greene Washington Caldwell (1806–1864), North Carolina State Senate
James Caldwell (Missouri speaker) (1763–1840), Missouri State Senate
James Caldwell (Ohio politician) (1770–1838), Ohio State Senate
Jim Caldwell (Arkansas politician) (born 1936), Arkansas State Senate
John Lawrence Caldwell (1875–1922), Kansas State Senate
John Caldwell (Kentucky politician) (1757–1804), Kentucky State Senate
Patrick C. Caldwell (1801–1855), South Carolina State Senate
Robert Porter Caldwell (1821–1885), Tennessee State Senate
Robert Caldwell (Wisconsin politician) (1866–1950), Wisconsin State Senate
Ron Caldwell (born 1951), Arkansas State Senate
Tod Robinson Caldwell (1818–1874), North Carolina State Senate
William Parker Caldwell (1832–1903), Tennessee State Senate